459th may refer to:

459th Air Refueling Wing, US Air Force Reserve Command unit based at Joint Base Andrews Naval Air Facility since 1954
459th Airlift Squadron (459 AS), part of the 374th Airlift Wing at Yokota Air Base, Japan

See also
459 (number)
459, the year 459 (CDLIX) of the Julian calendar
459 BC